Michael S. Fanselow is an American psychologist, currently a Distinguished Professor at University of California, Los Angeles, specializing in learning and behavior and behavioral neuroscience, and is also a published author of 4 books, having a total number of 655 library holdings, the highest book is held in 513 libraries worldwide.

References

Year of birth missing (living people)
Living people
21st-century American psychologists
University of California, Los Angeles faculty